Buckaroo Blue Grass is the twenty-eighth studio album by the American singer-songwriter Michael Martin Murphey, and his first album of bluegrass music.

Track listing
 "Lone Cowboy" (Murphey) – 3:12
 "What Am I Doing Hangin' Round?" (Murphey) – 3:09
 "Lost River" (Murphey) – 3:17
 "Carolina in the Pines" (Murphey) – 4:36
 "Cherokee Fiddle" (Murphey) – 4:21
 "Dancing in the Meadow" (Murphey) – 3:45
 "Healing Spring" (Murphey) – 4:57
 "Fiddlin' Man" (Murphey, Norman, Rains) – 4:25
 "Boy from the Country" (Murphey) – 4:23
 "Wild Bird" (Murphey) – 2:56
 "Close to the Land (America's Heartland)" (Murphey, Quist) – 4:26

Credits
Music
 Michael Martin Murphey – vocals, acoustic guitar, executive producer
 Ryan Murphey – acoustic guitar, vocals, producer
 Rhonda Vincent – vocals
 Pat Flynn – guitar
 Rob Ickes – dobro
 Charlie Cushman – banjo
 Mike Stidolph – mandolin
 Ronnie McCoury – mandolin
 Clay Riness – mandolin
 Sam Bush – mandolin, fiddle
 Andy Leftwich – fiddle
 David Davidson – fiddle
 Matthew Wilkes – bass guitar
 Craig Nelson – bass guitar
Production
 Keith Compton – engineer
 Don Edwards – liner notes

Chart performance

References
Notes

Citations

External links
 Michael Martin Murphey's official website

2009 albums
Bluegrass albums
Michael Martin Murphey albums